The 1981–82 St. Francis Terriers men's basketball team represented St. Francis College during the 1981–82 NCAA Division I men's basketball season. The team was coached by Gene Roberti, who was in his third year at the helm of the St. Francis Terriers. The Terriers played their homes games at the  Generoso Pope Athletic Complex. This is the team's first year in the newly organized ECAC Metro Conference, which will later be known as the Northeast Conference. Also at this time the conference had 2 divisions, north and south, with St. Francis competing in the north division.

The Terriers finished their season at 10–17 overall and 8–7 in conference play. They participated in the 1982 ECAC Metro men's basketball tournament and lost in the opening round to Long Island 53–56.

Roster

Schedule and results

|-
!colspan=12 style="background:#0038A8; border: 2px solid #CE1126;;color:#FFFFFF;"| Regular season

 

  

 

  
|-
!colspan=12 style="background:#0038A8; border: 2px solid #CE1126;;color:#FFFFFF;"| ECAC Metro tournament

source

References

St. Francis Brooklyn Terriers men's basketball seasons
St. Francis
St. Francis Brooklyn Terriers men's basketball
St. Francis Brooklyn Terriers men's basketball